Pia Thomsen is a former Danish international cricketer who represented the Danish national team in 1993.

References

Living people
Danish women cricketers
Denmark women One Day International cricketers
Year of birth missing (living people)